Yair Tzaban (born 23 August 1930) is an Israeli politician, academic and social activist.

Biography
Tzaban was born in Jerusalem in 1930. During the 1948 Palestine War he fought in the Palmach. He was among the founders of Kibbutz Tzora, near Jerusalem.

In the 1950s, after moving to Tel Aviv, he studied in Seminar HaKibutzim (a teacher's college) and worked as a teacher and youth educator in the poor suburbs of Tel Aviv. Tzaban holds a BA degree in Jewish and General Philosophy from Tel Aviv University.

For 45 years Tzaban has been politically active. He was a member of the political bureau of the original Maki from 1965 to 1973 and its chairman in 1972–1973. In 1977 he was a co-founder of the Left Camp of Israel, a peace list which ran for the Knesset and Histadrut elections. In 1981 he was elected to the Knesset, where he served for 16 years as representative of the Alignment, Mapam and Meretz. In 1992 he was invited by the late Prime Minister Yitzhak Rabin to serve as the Minister of Immigrant Absorption and as a member of the Security Cabinet (until 1996). As Minister of Immigrant Absorption he strove to establish full co-operation with the leadership of the Jewish Agency. During the years 1996-2002 he served as the head of the Academic Board of the Lavon Institute for Research of the Labor Movement and lectured at Tel Aviv University to graduate students in the Department for Public Policy.

Since 1996 he has served as Chairman of the Board of Directors of Meitar - The College of Judaism as Culture in Jerusalem. In 2000 he initiated the publishing of The Encyclopedia of Jewish Culture in the Era of Modernization and Secularization, with Yirmiyahu Yovel as Editor in Chief and himself as Director General of the project. The Encyclopedia was published, in Hebrew, in 2007.

Throughout his career he has been deeply involved in the fight against religious coercion, for pluralistic approach and for granting equal status to the Reform and Conservative movements in Israel. As a result of this work, he was invited to be the guest of the Congress of the Reform Movement (Atlanta, 1995) and of the Conference of the Rabbis of the Conservative movement in the United States (1996). He also received (1997) Honorary Doctorate from the Hebrew Union College.

He is married to Shulamit, father to Smadar and Dror, and grandfather to Dana, Shai, Rothem and Noam. He is the brother in law of Captain Avraham Ariel, who holds the record of being the youngest ship captain in Israeli History.

References

External links
 

1930 births
Palmach members
Israeli educators
People from Jerusalem
Living people
Maki (historical political party) politicians
Left Camp of Israel politicians
Alignment (Israel) politicians
Mapam leaders
Meretz politicians
Members of the 10th Knesset (1981–1984)
Members of the 11th Knesset (1984–1988)
Members of the 12th Knesset (1988–1992)
Members of the 13th Knesset (1992–1996)